Cardale Jones (born September 29, 1992) is an American football quarterback for the Massachusetts Pirates of the Indoor Football League (IFL). He played college football at Ohio State. At the beginning of the 2014 season, Jones was listed as third on the Ohio State depth chart at quarterback. However, after injuries to Braxton Miller in August and J. T. Barrett in November, he started for the Buckeyes during the inaugural College Football Playoff National Championship, leading Ohio State to the title. Cardale Jones went on to be the starter for the Buckeyes for the first 7 games of the 2015 season. Jones was drafted by the Buffalo Bills in the fourth round of the 2016 NFL Draft. He has also played for the Los Angeles Chargers and Seattle Seahawks, as well as the DC Defenders of the XFL.

Early years
Jones attended Ginn Academy in Cleveland, Ohio and played football for Ted Ginn Sr. at Glenville High School. Students at Ginn Academy are allowed to play at Glenville High. Jones led the Tarblooders to the OHSAA D-I Championship game in 2009. While at Glenville, Jones also lettered in basketball and track. Jones was ranked by Rivals.com as a three-star recruit. He committed to Ohio State University in October 2011.

College career

2012 season

Jones redshirted as a freshman and thus did not play, but nevertheless drew controversy when he posted the following on his Twitter account:  The tweet received heavy criticism and Jones was suspended for one game. The tweet was featured as an example of bad social media behavior in the "Best Practices on Social Media" section of a textbook for "The Ole Miss Experience," a freshman year class at the University of Mississippi. In March 2014, head coach Urban Meyer described Jones as a "different guy" who was "making progress in the classroom." Later, Jones provided context for the tweet: 

Ultimately, on May 7, 2017, Jones graduated from Ohio State with a bachelor's degree in African-American Studies.

2013 season
Jones was sparingly used during his freshman season after red-shirting the 2012 season, playing only 39 snaps, attempting one pass and rushing for 128 yards and a touchdown on 17 carries.

2014 season

After entering the 2014 season as a redshirt sophomore, third on the Buckeyes' depth chart, Jones made his first start of his college career in the Big Ten Championship Game in place of J. T. Barrett, who had been injured the prior week versus Michigan. Jones led the #6 (AP) ranked Buckeyes squad to a 59–0 victory over the #11 ranked Wisconsin Badgers, on the eve of the NCAA football committee's inaugural playoff selection. Jones was named MVP of the game.

Jones made the second start of his college career, and the Ohio State Buckeyes defeated #1 ranked Alabama Crimson Tide 42–35 in the Allstate Sugar Bowl to advance to the College Football Playoff National Championship against the Oregon Ducks. In the College Football National Championship game, he excelled once again and led the Buckeyes to a 42–20 victory over the Ducks. Jones recorded 280 all-purpose yards, scoring two touchdowns. He completed 16 of 23 attempted passes for 242 yards, with one touchdown and one interception and ran for another 38 yards and a touchdown. The day after winning the National Championship, Jones discussed his future football career. In a news conference, Jones said that while he did not officially rule out declaring for the 2015 NFL Draft, he believes that he is "not ready for that level yet," partly because he has only started in 3 college football games. Jones confirmed on January 15, 2015 that he would not declare for the 2015 NFL Draft, and would stay with Ohio State for at least another year, most probably until he graduated.

2015 season

After a competition with Barrett that lasted the entire off-season, Jones was named the Buckeyes' starting quarterback immediately before game time in Ohio State's season opener at Virginia Tech. Both he and Barrett remained listed as co-starters on the depth chart headed into September 12 meeting with Hawaii. He set career highs in passing yards and completions against Maryland on September 10, 2015 with 21 completions, 291 passing yards, and two passing touchdowns. After starting the first seven games of the season, he was benched in favor of Barrett. After Ohio State's final home game, he announced his intention to enter the 2016 NFL Draft.

Statistics

Professional career
At the 2016 NFL Scouting Combine, Jones suffered a hamstring injury during his second 40-yard dash attempt, ending his workout prematurely.

Buffalo Bills
Despite only starting 11 games in his college career, Jones was drafted in the fourth round of the 2016 NFL Draft, with the 139th overall selection, by the Buffalo Bills. On June 7, 2016, the Bills signed Jones to a rookie contract. In 2016, he was inactive for the first 15 games of the season as the third-string quarterback behind primary backup EJ Manuel and starter Tyrod Taylor. With Taylor being inactive for the final game of the season against the New York Jets, Jones was promoted to second string. Jones entered the game to begin the fourth quarter after Manuel was benched. Jones completed 6-of-11 passes for 96 yards and no touchdowns with one interception.

Los Angeles Chargers
On July 26, 2017, Jones was traded to the Los Angeles Chargers in exchange for a conditional draft pick.

On September 2, 2018, Jones was waived by the Chargers and was signed to the practice squad the next day. Jones signed a reserve/future contract with the Chargers on January 14, 2019.

On August 31, 2019, Jones was released by the Chargers.

Seattle Seahawks
On September 7, 2019, Jones was signed to the Seattle Seahawks practice squad. He was released on September 18.

DC Defenders
Jones was allocated to the DC Defenders of the XFL on October 15, 2019. He signed a contract with the team on November 4, 2019. In his first XFL start, Jones went 16-of-26 for 291 yards and two touchdowns and led the team in rushing, helping propel the DC Defenders to their first win. Jones would lead the Defenders to the XFL's first shutout, defeating the New York Guardians in Week 2 behind his 276 yards and two touchdowns in the 27–0 victory. He had his contract terminated when the league suspended operations on April 10, 2020.

Jones had a tryout with the Las Vegas Raiders on August 23, 2020.

Edmonton Elks
On May 6, 2022, it was announced that Jones had signed with the Edmonton Elks. Jones was released by the Elks on May 20, 2022.

Massachusetts Pirates
On December 19, 2022, Jones signed with the Massachusetts Pirates of the Indoor Football League (IFL).

Statistics

Source:

References

External links

 Ohio State Buckeyes bio

1992 births
Living people
Players of American football from Cleveland
American football quarterbacks
Glenville High School alumni
Ohio State Buckeyes football players
Buffalo Bills players
Los Angeles Chargers players
Seattle Seahawks players
African-American players of American football
DC Defenders players
Edmonton Elks players
21st-century African-American sportspeople